Miss International 2001, the 41st Miss International pageant, was held on October 4, 2001 at the Nakano Sun Plaza in Tokyo, Japan. At the end of the event, Vivian Urdaneta of Venezuela crowned her successor Małgorzata Rożniecka of Poland.

Results

Placements

Contestants

  – María Victoria Branda
  – Daphne Dione Croes
  – Joan Priscilla Quiroga
  – Fernanda Tinti Borja Pinto
  – Michelle Watson
  – Shauna Leah-Ann Olechow
  – Paula Orchard
  – María Rocio Stevenson Covo
  – Martina Poljak
  – Vanessa van Arendonk
  – Maria Alecou Hadzivassiliou
  – Andrea Vranová
  – Belgica Judith Cury de Lara
  – Hanna Mirjami Pajulammi
  – Nawal Benhlal
  – Anna Ziemski
  – Fotini Kokari
  – Rosa Maria Castañeda Aldana
  – Yoon Hee Jenny Lee
  – Caroline Heijboer
  – Hoi Ting Heidi Chu
  – Iris Dögg Oddsdóttir
  – Dikla Elkabetz
  – Hanako Suzuki (鈴木華子)
  – Baek Myoung-hee
  – Laura Vīksna
  – Dragana Klopcevska
  – Cheah Teck Yoong
  – Ruth Spiteri
  – Irma Mariana Ríos Franco
  – Sansarmaa Tsedevsuren Luvsandoo
  – Renneé Fabiola Dávila
  – Rowina Taimanao Ogo
  – Siv Therese Hegerland Havik
  – Indira Isikl Kazuma
  – Maricarl Canlas Tolosa
  – Małgorzata Rożniecka
  – Lorna Otero Pérez
  – Tatiana Pavlova
  – Marzia Bellesso
  – Juley Binte Abdullah
  – Barbara Pappova
  – Ayola Molina Carrasco
  – Sara Nicole Cameron
  – Kanithakan Saengprachaksakula
  – Leila Oualha
  – Ece F. Incedursun
  – Natalia Bakulina
  – Eleana Thompson
  – Aura Zambrano
  – Iva Gordana Milivojevic

Notes

Withdrawals

  – Heba Abo-Mandour
  – Nathaly Maamari
  – Larissa Kovalchuk
  – Fariba Hawkins
  – Tania Ramirez
  – Mereani Ateni
  – Sasha St. Hill

Replacements
  – Maria Elisa Canti (to concentrate on the Miss Europe pageant)

References

External links
 Pageantopolis – Miss International 2001

2001
2001 in Tokyo
2001 beauty pageants
Beauty pageants in Japan